The Battle of Nezib (present-day Nizip) was fought on 24 June 1839 between Egypt and the Ottoman Empire.  The Egyptians were led by Ibrahim Pasha, while the Ottomans were led by Hafiz Osman Pasha, with Helmuth von Moltke the Elder playing an advisory role, in command of the Ottoman artillery.

Battle 
Several hours prior to when the major combat began, von Moltke had pleaded Hafiz Pasha to withdraw to a more secure and fortified position near Birecik and to await expected reinforcements, as Hafiz Pasha's forces were outmatched in quality by the advancing Egyptians. Initially Hafiz acquiesced to Moltke, but not long after he decided to maintain his army's position, due to the advice of his mullahs.

The Ottoman troops under Hafiz Pasha were positioned at Mezar, southwest of Nezib, with the Nezib river on their left. Ibrahim advanced his force, under heavy Ottoman artillery fire, towards the Ottoman lines. At the same time, the Ottoman line began to take Egyptian artillery fire, and were suffering losses. By the time Ibrahim's infantry had encountered the Ottoman line, Hafiz's army was in complete rout, the Egyptian artillery having broken their morale. The Ottoman army was composed mainly of recently subdued Kurdish conscripts, and their morale was low.

The two armies 
The two armies were well equipped and balanced.  The number of soldiers in each army was approximately forty thousand men, supported by artillery and knights. Constantine Bazili says:

"Since he applied European tactics in the East, he has never met in the battlefield of Al-Wa better than these two armies." 

In terms of training the Egyptian army, he was trained in the latest military methods in terms of organizing ranks, speed of movement and maneuvering, the presence of Suleiman Pasha the French as chief of staff of the Egyptian army, and the leadership of Ibrahim Pasha, who became an expert on how to defeat the Ottoman armies years ago,

On the other hand, the Ottoman army enjoyed the preference in terms of preparation, as the Ottoman army was better supplied with supplies and had rested for several weeks in its camp, unlike the Egyptian soldiers who were exhausted by the march to meet the Ottoman army under the heat of the sun at the beginning of the summer.

The two armies were close together. Hafez Pasha, the commander of the Ottoman army, spent an entire month digging trenches and establishing strongholds and fortresses, and his army was flexible to defend and attack in that region, and there was a difference between those who stood to defend and those assigned to attack, as the attack is undoubtedly more difficult. But Ibrahim Pasha's army was more complete and more combat-oriented.  Ibrahim Pasha and his chief of staff, Suleiman Pasha Ali, had one opinion, while Hafez Pasha and his Chief of Staff Moltech had two different opinions.  Ibrahim Pasha's officers respected and feared him, and all of them had earned their ranks from his wall and merit. As for the officers of the Turkish army, most of them were among the leaders of the rulers and ministers in Istanbul.

One story narrates how  Hafez Pasha, the commander of the Ottoman army, asked a prisoner from Ibrahim Pasha's army his opinion in the two camps, then the Egyptian prisoner told him after Hafiz Pasha gave him safety:

“Ibrahim Pasha’s camp is a soldier’s camp. As for your camp, it is like the pilgrims’ strikes. In Ibrahim's camp you only see soldiers with their weapons, besides their horses and cannons. As for your camp, I saw the Jews, merchants, scholars, and jurists.  Your camp is like pilgrimage rackets.”

European intervention  
The Turkish army was wiped out, the spoil of its weapons was almost complete, and thousands of prisoners agreed to transfer their allegiance to the Egyptian army, so they were dispatched to Egypt, and thus the road became open for Ibrahim Pasha to enter the Ottoman capital, and the Ottoman fleet learned of this matter, so he headed to Alexandria, Egypt, so that the fleet commander would hand over his entire fleet to Muhammad  Ali to be under his command. But European countries, led by Britain, refused to see a strong empire in the East in Egypt threatening Britain's trade route to its colonies in India. European fleets gathered and the London Treaty of 1840 was concluded, which resulted in Egypt being stripped of all its newly acquired territories and deprived  of the fruits of its victory, and indeed the matter ended with the complete withdrawal of the Egyptian forces from all of the Levant and the imposition of restrictions, including that  the size of the Egyptian army was not to exceed 18 thousand fighters, whereas before   it had exceeded 300 thousand. Moreover, Muhammad Ali Pasha was required to accept that his rule for Egypt and Sudan was subordinate to the Ottoman state.

References

Bibliography
 Alison, Archibald, History of Europe from the Fall of Napoleon in 1815 to the Accession of Louis Napoleon in 1852, p. 538. W. Blackwood, 1856.
 Chisholm, Hugh, The Encyclopædia Britannica, p. 678. University of Virginia Press, 1911
 Masson, David, Macmillan's Magazine, p. 480. Macmillan and Co., 1882. Item notes: v.46 1882 May-Oct

Nezib
Nezib
Conflicts in 1839
1839 in Egypt
History of Gaziantep Province
June 1839 events